Barnesiella viscericola  is a Gram-negative, obligately anaerobic, non-spore-forming and non-motile bacterium from the genus of Barnesiella which has been isolated from chicken caecum in Japan.

References

External links
Type strain of Barnesiella viscericola at BacDive -  the Bacterial Diversity Metadatabase	

Bacteroidia
Bacteria described in 2007